Matthieu Gore, better known as Matt Houston or Matt, is a French singer and music producer originating from Guadeloupe. He was born in Sainte-Anne, Guadeloupe, on 30 September 1977. He has released five albums and a number of singles.

Career
He started very young in music in Guadeloupe where he won in a singing competition. He later on relocated to Paris living in the 12ème arrondissement. At 16, he took music lessons and played piano and guitar and formed a band with a friend before launching his solo career. In 1996, he established his own record label called on the Track. His debut album was released in June 1999 called Matt, with moderate success followed in 2001 by R&B 2 Rue that won the R&B best album category at 2002 Victoires de la Musique awards and reached platinum status. The leading single "R&B 2 Rue" from the album was his most successful single. Matt Houston also released  Chant de bataille in 2003, that had collaborations with a number of rap artists including Sat, Don Choa (of Fonky Family), Dadoo, Skalde Blase. The album was certified gold. In 2006, he released Phoenix 2006, with collaborations with Big Ali, Joe Houston and VR, rappers DJ Scandalous, Eloquence and Busta Flex, and the young Nathy. Matt produced most of the album, in addition to the producer houses Deck, Da Konsepta and producers Komplex and Stéphane Filey. He came back in 2010 with the album Papa est back, with collaborations with Lord Kossity, Kery James, Amel Bent and a mix of R&B with hip hop, zouk, Latin and electro vibes.

After writing "I Wanna Chat" as a soundtrack for Secret Story, Matt launched the girl power band, Hot.Chick.

Matt Houston was involved in a lawsuit against French singer Matthieu Tota, who had picked Matt Pokora as a stage name ,and won the lawsuit forcing Matt Pokora to change his name to M. Pokora, after having released his first self-titled album Matt Pokora and his single "Showbiz (The Battle)" under the name Matt Pokora.

In 2012, he bought a night club in Dammarie les Lys (77), near to Paris and released a new album Racines. His single "Positif" with the Nigerian group P Square was a summer hit in France. He collaborated on the single "Happy Birthday" with Mokobé.

Discography

Albums

EPs
2008: Matt Houston: Anthologie 1998 – 2007 (Mixtape in download only)

Singles

Collaborations

Featured in

Other non-charting singles
2000: "Cybersex" 
2000: "Je croyais en toi" (feat. Frédo and Kfear of La Brigade)
2002: "Hotel motel" (feat. Sat of "Fonky Family")
2003: "Wicked"
2005: "Chabine"
2006: "Phoenix" 
2008: "Papa est back" (feat. Black Kent)
2010: "PlastiQ"
2010: "Booty shake"
2010: "Ou tu veux quand tu veux"
2010/2011: "Cunnilingus"
2010/2011: "Point G"

Promotional and unofficial singles
2005: "Shorty"
2006: "Le test"
2006: "Dance with me" (with group Pass Pass) (appears on Big Ballers vol. 1 compilation)
2007: "Fuck This Industry"
2011: "Shawty A Gangsta" (with DJ Scandalous & Bad Boy artist Red Cafe)
2011: "Sex Toy" (with DJ Scandalous & Atlantic artist Trina)
2012: "The King Is Back [LeBron James]" (with DJ Scandalous)
2012: "La GoGo (Roof On Fire)" (featuring DJ Scandalous, Jadakiss & Styles P of The Lox)

References

External links
Mat Houston and record label On The Track
Matt Houston MySpace site

1977 births
Living people
French record producers
Guadeloupean musicians
21st-century French singers
21st-century French male singers